Deryck Marks (born 30 October 1963) is a Jamaican swimmer. He competed in four events at the 1984 Summer Olympics.

References

1963 births
Living people
Jamaican male swimmers
Olympic swimmers of Jamaica
Swimmers at the 1984 Summer Olympics
Place of birth missing (living people)